Karen Ross Findlay (born 1968) is a Scottish rugby coach and former international player who played for the Scotland women's national rugby union team. She coaches Harlequins Ladies who compete in the Women's Premiership. She won 85 caps for Scotland and captained the side 52 times. She is a T/commander with the Metropolitan Police.

Early life
Findlay was born in 1968 in Cullen, Moray, Scotland.

Playing career
She went to university in Edinburgh and began playing rugby while she was there.

Her first international appearance was against Wales in 1996. She first captained Scotland in 2001. In 2005 she captained Scotland team for the 50th time. She retired in 2006 after playing in the IRB Rugby World Cup 2006 Canada, the third world cup she had represented Scotland at.

Coaching career
She was head coach at Richmond Women and during ten seasons at the club they won five Premiership titles.

In January 2011 she was announced as the first female coach for Scotland women's team. In December 2012 she was appointed as under-16 women's head coach.

She became the coach at Aylesford Bulls Ladies in 2016. She remained as a coach as the club then formed a partnership with Harlequin F.C. to compete as Harlequins Ladies and in the Women's Premiership from 2017.

Policing career
She works as a Temporary commander with the Metropolitan Police. She had an important role in the police co-ordination team that worked on security for the Olympic Park during the 2012 games.

References

1968 births
Living people
Female sports coaches
Metropolitan Police officers
Sportspeople from Moray
Scotland women's international rugby union players
Scottish female rugby union players
Scottish rugby union coaches
Women Metropolitan Police officers
Women's rugby union in Scotland